Atmospheric super-rotation is the state where a planet's atmosphere rotates faster than the planet itself. The atmosphere of Venus is one example of extreme super-rotation; the Venusian atmosphere circles the planet in just four Earth days, much faster than Venus' sidereal day of 243 Earth days. Atmospheric super-rotation has also been observed on Titan, the largest moon of Saturn.

It is believed that the Earth's thermosphere has a small net super-rotation in excess of the surface rotational velocity, although estimates of the size of the phenomenon vary widely. Some models suggest that global warming is likely to cause an increase in super-rotation in future, including possible super-rotation of surface winds.

References 

Climate change and the environment